Osbornedale State Park is a public recreation area occupying  on the east bank of the Housatonic River primarily in the town of Derby, Connecticut, with a small portion in Ansonia. The state park includes the historic Osborne Homestead, the Kellogg Environmental Center, and an extensive system of hiking trails. The park is managed by the Connecticut Department of Energy and Environmental Protection.

History
The park was formerly the estate of the Osborne family, the owners of metalworking and textile product factories in the Naugatuck Valley area. Frances Osborne Kellogg and her husband, Waldo Kellogg, assembled the property through the acquisition of several farms. The Kelloggs operated two successful farming operations on the land under the name of Osbornedale Farms. One farm specialized in breeding Osbornedale Holstein cows and the other produced milk from a herd of Jersey cows. Prior uses of the park land included silver mining in the years after the American Revolutionary War and bottling of spring water. The  estate was given to the state of Connecticut by Frances Osborne Kellogg upon her death in 1956.

Activities and amenities
The park preserves the historic Osbornedale house, which offers tours, as well as an adjacent property that is part of the state's resident curator program. The Kellogg Environmental Center offers educational programs. Hiking trails, a pond for fishing and ice skating, and picnicking facilities are also available.

References

External links

Osbornedale State Park Connecticut Department of Energy and Environmental Protection
Osbornedale State Park Map Connecticut Department of Energy and Environmental Protection

State parks of Connecticut
Parks in New Haven County, Connecticut
Derby, Connecticut
Ansonia, Connecticut
Protected areas established in 1956
1956 establishments in Connecticut